Sketch Artist, also known as The Sketch Artist, is a 1992 American made-for-television crime-thriller film written by Michael Angeli and directed  by Phedon Papamichael and starring Jeff Fahey, Sean Young and Drew Barrymore. Released theatrically in Canada, Sweden and South Korea.
thumbnail|Alternative cover and title.

Plot
During a homicide investigation, a police sketch artist realizes a witness is describing a suspect resembling the artist's wife down to the last detail. Conflicted by this revelation, he withholds pertinent information and begins his own search for the truth.

Cast
  Jeff Fahey as Detective Jack Whitfield
  Sean Young as Rayanne Whitfield
  Frank McRae as Milon
  Drew Barrymore as Daisy
  Tchéky Karyo as Paul Korbel
  James Tolkan as Tonelli
  Stacy Haiduk as Claire
  Charlotte Lewis as Leese
  Mark Boone Junior as Sturges
  Ric Young as Jimmy  
  Brad Johnson as Peter

Reception
Variety said it had a "smart script by journalist Michael Angeli and a strong lead performance by Jeff Fahey."

Sequel

A sequel starring Fahey and Courteney Cox, Sketch Artist II: Hands That See, followed in 1995.

References

External links

1992 films
1992 television films
1992 thriller films
American television films
American thriller films
Films about artists
Films scored by Mark Isham
1990s English-language films
Films directed by Phedon Papamichael
1990s American films